VUUR  ("fire", "passion" or "drive") is a Dutch progressive metal band formed in 2016 by singer and lyricist Anneke van Giersbergen and musicians she has worked with previously in bands like The Gentle Storm or her own solo band.

The band is intended to express van Giersbergen's heavy metal side, as opposed to the softer side of her solo career. They released their debut album In This Moment We Are Free – Cities in October 2017.

History 
Singer Marcela Bovio was initially part of the line-up. However, when the recording of the band's debut album started, Bovio and Van Giersbergen "wanted to take very different directions when it came to the sound and approach of the vocals". After failing to find a compromise that would satisfy both creatively, it was decided that Bovio would leave the band, as the two were afraid that doing otherwise would leave both regretful and hurt their friendship. Bovio made her departure official on 11 April 2017, stating "I'm truly devastated, because I'm a huge fan of Anneke and every single member of the band; they're all incredibly sweet people, as well as top notch musicians. Plus, the songs are so fantastic… this is going to be a revolutionary album! But I have to follow my heart and choose for what I think in the future will bring me (and the rest of the band) happiness, no matter how hard it feels right now. Anneke, Fer, Jord, Johan and Ed: you guys are THE BEST. I'd wish you luck but you don't need it, you are going to ROCK this world".

They released their debut album In This Moment We Are Free – Cities on 20 October 2017 and are expected to tour until the end of 2018. By October 2017, van Giersbergen was already writing songs for a second album.

Members 
 Anneke van Giersbergen (ex-The Gathering, The Gentle Storm) – lead vocals, rhythm guitar
 Jord Otto (My Propane, ex-ReVamp) – guitars
 Ferry Duijsens (Anneke van Giersbergen) – guitars
 Johan van Stratum (Stream of Passion) – bass
 Ed Warby (Gorefest, Ayreon) – drums

Former member 
 Marcela Bovio (Stream of Passion, ex-Elfonía) – vocals (2016–2017)

Timeline

Discography 
 Studio albums
 In This Moment We Are Free – Cities (2017)

 Singles
 "The Mermaid and the Horseman" (2017)

References 

Musical groups established in 2016
Heavy metal supergroups
Dutch progressive metal musical groups
2016 establishments in the Netherlands
Inside Out Music artists